Jonkheer Henri Ghislain Joseph Marie Hyacinthe de Brouckère (25 January 1801 – 25 January 1891) was a Belgian nobleman and liberal politician. Born in Bruges, he was a magistrate, and a professor at the Université Libre de Bruxelles. His brother Charles was mayor of Brussels.

He served as governor of Antwerp from 1840 to 1844, and of Liège from 1844 to 1846. He headed a Liberal government from 1852 to 1855 as the prime minister. In 1863 he became the first mayor of Auderghem. He later chaired the Caisse générale d'épargne et de retraite.

Honours 
 National
 : 
 Iron Cross.
 Minister of State, by Royal Decree.
 Grand Cordon in the Order of Leopold.
 Commander in the Royal Order of the Lion.
Foreign
 : Knight Grand Cross in the Saxe-Ernestine House Order.
 :Knight Grand Cross in the Order of Leopold of Austria.
 : Knight Grand Cross in the Legion of Honour.
 : Knight Grand Cross in the Order of Charles III.
 : Knight Grand Cross in the Order of Saints Maurice and Lazarus
 Knight Grand Cross in the Order of Saint Gregory the Great, 1850.
 Knight Grand Cross in the Order of Saint Januarius.
 :Knight Grand Cross in the Order of Christ.
 Knight Grand Cross in the Order of Saint Louis.
 :Commander of the Order of the Netherlands Lion.
 :Knight 1st class; Order of the Red Eagle.

References

|-

1801 births
1891 deaths
Prime Ministers of Belgium
Government ministers of Belgium
Governors of Antwerp Province
19th-century Belgian politicians
Ambassadors of Belgium to the Holy See
Belgian nobility
Liberal Party (Belgium) politicians
Mayors of places in Belgium
Members of the National Congress of Belgium
Politicians from Bruges